Deeper (sometimes known simply as Tunnels 2) is the sequel to the novel Tunnels, written by Roderick Gordon and Brian Williams.

The novel explores the events which Will, Chester and his friends have to go through to attempt to prevent the Styx from continuing their next phase of destruction upon the inhabitants of the Earth's surface.

Plot summary
Part 1: Breaking Cover

Will and Chester are overjoyed to be reunited once again as the Miners' Train travels down through the Earth on its way to the Deeps. Will's younger brother, Cal, is also with them. The train passes through a series of storm gates (gates designed to block powerful winds from inside the earth) and, on the final approach to the Miners' Station, the three boys jump from it. Having escaped detection at the station, they travel further into the Deeps, where they are attacked by carnivorous bats and are forced to take shelter in an old, deserted house. Inside the house they find evidence that Will's stepfather, Dr. Burrows, has already been there.

Sarah adopts a disguise, allowing her to become a woman who has the authority to interview a deranged Mrs. Burrows, who currently is residing at Humphrey House. However, when her fear that Will actually killed Tam clouds her judgment, Mrs. Burrows quickly realizes the fake, forcing Sarah to flee. Soon, she is acquainted with a much skinnier, much weaker Bartleby, who takes her to a hiding place. There, a few days later, Rebecca and the Styx show up and make her believe for sure that Will killed Tam. Rebecca tells her that she knows where Will is, and that he is forcing Cal to come with him, and, if she doesn't act soon, Will might also kill him. Finally, they explain that Cal and Bartleby shared a strong bond, and, because of his love for Cal, Bartleby would be able to track him down anywhere...

Finally, Dr. Burrows is shown to be still alive. He has been accepted by a strange, gentle group of people called Coprolites. Sadly for them, a special detachment of the Styx called Limiters has been killing them. Having been left provisions by the Coprolites before they moved camp to a safer location, Dr. Burrows packs up and leaves, continuing further into the Deeps, keeping his notebook with him at all times.

Part 2: The Homecoming

Sarah is taken to see her mother, Grandma Macaulay, in her old home. Grandma Macaulay has been persuaded by the Styx that Will was responsible for Tam's demise, and she is full of vengeance and asks Sarah to exact revenge on the boy. Sarah is then escorted to the Styx Garrison where she rests, is given military training, and is also subjected to sermons from The Book of Catastrophes.

Concerned that their food supplies are running low, Will and Chester follow Cal down into an opening of the floor of the Great Plain, where Cal enters a cavern filled with unidentified pipe-like organisms. As he stumbles, Cal touches one of these organisms, then collapses. Will and Chester discover that the boy isn't breathing, but they are forced to flee the cavern in order to save their own lives.

Back at Topsoil, it is dawn in England, and Rebecca and a squad of Styx are on the rooftop of Admiralty Arch, overlooking Trafalgar Square, with baskets of doves. Attached to the leg of each bird is a small metal ball which, when melted by the sun, will release a small amount of a non-deadly form of the virus that the Styx have been working on. The section ends with Rebecca cheering the doves on to "Fly, fly, fly!".

Part 3: Drake and Elliott

After his brother's death, Will is beside himself with grief, and Chester becomes increasingly concerned about the strange way he is acting. Shortly thereafter, they witness the execution of a group of Coprolites by a patrol of Styx Limiters. Will's abnormal behavior takes over again, and he asks for a piece of chewing gum. Before he unwraps it, knives are put at both boys' throats. A man speaks, telling them to bury the gum, and then to come with them. With no alternative but to do what they are told, Will and Chester comply with these demands.

The two strangers introduce themselves as renegades, namely Drake and Elliott. Drake soon realizes it is important to keep Will alive because he thinks Will may be the cause of the increased Styx presence in the Deeps, and also because he discovers Will is Sarah Jerome's son. For the most part, Elliott maintains a hostile attitude towards the boys, except for Chester. Cal, who Will and Chester feared had perished in a "sugar trap", is resuscitated by Drake.

Sarah persuades Joseph to allow her to leave the Styx Garrison so she can revisit the Rookeries, a place where the most deprived Colonists are left to rot, and where she and her brother Tam played as children. However, as she passes through the area, she is recognized and hailed as a hero. As she emerges from the Rookeries, she is met by Rebecca who tells her they are to leave for the Deeps on the Miners' Train.

Back at Topsoil, the virus created by the Styx scientists has been spread, and is wreaking havoc on England. The symptoms are some coughing, and swollen eyes, which make reading and looking at objects very hard. A grouchy Mrs. Burrows is visited by a man who has a distinguished voice and likes boiled eggs, hence Mrs. Burrows's nickname for him: "boiled-egg man". Boiled-egg Man tells her everything will be fine, when, in fact, it is steadily getting worse. Soon, a woman named Mrs. L dies, and not long after that, the laboratory that researches the virus is burned. When Boiled-egg Man appears on the news, claiming that there was no case of arson and that it was an experiment that blew the lab up, killing five scientists. Mrs. Burrows, who believes the opposite, becomes very angry.

Part 4: The Island

When they are attacked by Limiters, Will becomes separated from Drake, Elliott, Cal and Chester, and without any food or light, becomes completely lost in the lava tubes for several days. He eventually emerges from the lava tubes, and is reunited with Chester. Meanwhile, Drake and Elliott take Cal with them as they search the Great Plain for Will, and here they come to a place called the Bunker, which it appears was once used to breed Coprolites. One area in the Bunker is now being used to test the Dominion virus, which the Styx intend to use to decimate a large proportion of the Topsoil population. After a Styx ambush, Drake is captured outside the Bunker, while Elliott and Cal manage to escape. The two return to Will and Chester, and then Elliott leads them all to an island in a subterranean sea.

Elliott takes Will to scout, and they discover that Drake is being tortured. Elliott decides to kill him to put him out of his misery. When they return to the camp, Elliott captures a "night crab" for a meal, which Will identifies as a relic species of Anomalocaris.

Part 5: The Pore

Dr. Burrows comes across a temple-like structure, built by a civilization that worships a sun. He discovers a hoard of large dust mites and then comes across a huge, mile-long hole, which he accidentally falls into.

Elliott's initial plan is to take the boys to a place called the Wetlands, where they will allegedly be safe. She takes them through a tunnel, but before long, Bartleby appears, and Cal is delighted. Elliott shoots an advancing stranger, which turns out to be Sarah Jerome. Will and Cal assures her that he did not kill Tam, then he and the others continue on their way. At her insistence, because she is too badly injured and would only slow them down, Sarah stays behind.

Drake is revealed to have survived the bunker attack, and that the man Will shot was a different man. He sees Sarah and lures a Styx patrol away, rescuing her. He takes her to the Pore, where they witness the events that follow.

They eventually come across the huge hole; the same one Dr. Burrows fell into. It is identified as the Pore, which stretches even deeper into the Earth's surface. Before long, they are ambushed by Rebecca, and she reveals that there is not one but two of her; they are twins, and they have been alternatively living in Will's home, posing as his younger sister. They reveal their plot to kill all Topsoilers with a deadly virus called Dominion, which was extracted from the Eternal City by the Styx Division. The twins order the Limiters to open fire; Cal is killed as a result. Will, Elliott, Chester, and Bartleby are blown into the Pore by the Styx's heavy guns. The Rebecca twins presume that they have fallen to their death, and the Limiters cease fire.

Sarah, who is close to death from her gunshot wounds, witnesses this. She draws upon her last remaining strength and, in a headlong rush at the Rebecca twins, takes them over the edge of the Pore with her.

Several days later, Drake is shown Topsoil as he observes a Colonist who is, in turn, observing Mrs. Burrows. It is clear that he wants to exact his revenge on the Styx for the deaths of Sarah and Cal. The book ends when he dials a phone and waits for an answer.

Reception
Following its release in the US on 3 February 2009, the book very quickly appeared on The New York Times Children's Chapter Books Best Seller List on 22 February 2009.

It received overwhelmingly positive reviews. Metacritic called "it a great book filled with suspense at every page". Meagan Albright's review stated, "It is a rare book that can create an entirely new fantastic, harsh, creative yet believable world for readers to visit. This book is not only sure to be a hit with existing fans of the series; it will also attract new readers to this dark and twisty world". And Bonnie Kunzel for Voya, wrote, "This page-turner has lots of action and deeds of derring-do for fans of dark, dystopian fantasies".

References

External links
 Tunnels Books Series Official Website
 Chicken House Publishing Website
 Tunnels Series UK Official Fansite
 Roderick Gordon's Official Website

2008 British novels
2008 science fiction novels
British science fiction novels
British young adult novels
Children's science fiction novels
Archaeology in popular culture
Bioterrorism in fiction
Colonialism in popular culture
Fictional civilizations
Hollow Earth in fiction
Human experimentation in fiction
Lost world novels
Phoenicia in fiction
Sequel novels
Novels set in subterranea
Terrorism in fiction
Underground railways in fiction